Damali Abrams (born in Guyana) is a Guyanese-American video-performance artist who lives and works in New York City. She is known for the Self-Help TV, an ongoing video-performance project using her own body to examine issues of self-improvement, race, class and gender.

Career
Abrams graduated New York University as a Bachelor of Arts in 2001 and obtained a master's degree in fine arts from Vermont College of Fine Arts in 2008. Her work has been exhibited at galleries including The Museum of Contemporary African Diasporan Art (MoCADA), El Museo del Barrio, A.I.R. Gallery, BRIC Rotunda Gallery and the Jamaica Center for Arts & Learning.

Teaching and workshops
Abrams has led classes at Barbados Community College, the Grenada National Museum, the Borough of Manhattan Community College, Hunter College School of Social Work, SUNY Purchase, Syracuse University’s 601 Tully and at NYU Polytechnic School of Engineering.

Awards
 2009–10: A.I.R. Fellowship Recipient

Residencies
 2019: Creative-in-Residence at The Brooklyn Public Library
 2016: International Studio Program at The Whitney Museum of American Art
 July 2014: Apexart’s Outbound Residency to Seoul
 2014: Artist in Residence at The Center for Book Arts
 October 2013: Residency with Groundation Grenada and  Fresh Milk in Barbados

References

External links
 Damali Abram's Website

Living people
American video artists
American women artists
Artists from New York City
Guyanese artists
Guyanese women artists
New York University alumni
Vermont College of Fine Arts alumni
Year of birth missing (living people)
21st-century American women